Natural, Everyday Degradation is the second studio album by Remo Drive, released on May 31, 2019. Natural, Everyday Degradation sees the band take a different artistic direction, drifting away from the emo sound of Greatest Hits. This is their first studio album without drummer Sam Mathys.

Background
As early as 2016, the band began demoing songs for the album shortly after the Greatest Hits sessions wrapped. Natural, Everyday Degradation was recorded after the departure of drummer Sam Mathys in February 2018 with drum parts being recorded by Braeden Keenan & Sam Becht. When asked about the change of musical style of Natural, Everyday Degradation in an interview, Erik Paulson replied, "...as far as like, styles go, I think just our, our tastes have changed, we've grown up a little bit. And uh, not wanting to fit in quite as neatly in with, I feel like there's kind of a scene with a bunch of bands that do a similar, kind of upbeat, kind of party emo thing right now, and I think, more than anything, we just wanted to separate ourselves from what was going on, and make it clear that we're, kind of on our own path and not a part of a group, or a scene, or a clique or anything."

Reception

Critical reception on Natural, Everyday Degradation was mixed. Getalternative.com gave the album a "disappointing" for a score, as the editor states, "Natural, Everyday Degradation falls flat. Each track borrows things from each other, and not in a way that allows each track to stay as an individual song. The album overall is really disappointing and feels as if the band played it safe. I hope that on future releases they will take back the initiative and push the envelope a bit more like I know they are capable of doing." In a YUNO review (a short, quick opinionated review to give thoughts on an album) by Anthony Fantano, he says, "I'm just utterly disappointed with what the band has delivered on this new project with Epitaph. I think their sound, I think their performance, I think their delivery has, for the most part, just really lost its ‘teeth.’ Everything seems toned down in the worst way possible."

Track listing

Personnel
As per Bandcamp

Remo Drive
Erik Paulson – lead vocals, guitar, synthesizer, electric piano, upright piano, organ, percussion
Stephen Paulson – bass guitar, synthesizer, piano, organ

Additional musicians
Sam Becht – drums 
Braeden Keenan - drums 
Shane Woods - drums 
Grant Whiteoak - backing vocals 
Lee Tran - saxophone, piano, electric piano

References

2019 albums
Remo Drive albums
Epitaph Records albums